Volleyball at the 2017 Southeast Asian Games in Kuala Lumpur were held at Malaysia International Trade & Exhibition Centre in Kuala Lumpur from 21 to 27 August 2017.

The 2017 Games will feature competitions in two events.

Competition schedule
The following was the competition schedule for the volleyball competitions:

Participation

Participating nations

Men's tournament

Women's tournament

Men's competition

Preliminary round

Group A

Group B

Final round

Women's competition

Preliminary round

Group A

Group B

Final round

Medal summary

Medal table

Medalists

See also
Sitting volleyball at the 2017 ASEAN Para Games

References

External links